In number theory, more specifically in p-adic analysis, Krasner's lemma is a basic result relating the topology of a complete non-archimedean field to its algebraic extensions.

Statement
Krasner's lemma states:

then K(α) ⊆ K(β).

Applications
Krasner's lemma can be used to show that -adic completion and separable closure of global fields commute.
Another application is to proving that Cp — the completion of the algebraic closure of Qp — is algebraically closed.

Generalization
Krasner's lemma has the following generalization.
Consider a monic polynomial 
 
of degree n > 1
with coefficients in a Henselian field (K, v) and roots in the
algebraic closure . Let I and J be two disjoint,
non-empty sets with union {1,...,n}. Moreover, consider a
polynomial 

Assume

Then the coefficients of the polynomials

are contained in the field extension of K generated by the
coefficients of g. (The original Krasner's lemma corresponds to the situation where g has degree 1.)

Notes

References

 
 

Lemmas in number theory
Field (mathematics)